The politics of the Maldives, as per the reports, take place in the framework of a presidential representative democratic republic, whereby the President is the Head of Government. Executive power is exercised by the government. The President heads the executive branch and appoints the Cabinet; like many presidential democracies, each member of the cabinet need to be approved by the Parliament. The President, along with their pick for vice president, is directly elected by the denizens to a five-year term by a secret ballot. Once in office, they could be re-elected to a second 5-year term, which is the limit allowed by the Constitution. The current President of the Maldives is Ibrahim Mohamed Solih, who was sworn into office on July 13, 2018, when his predecessor, Abdulla Yameen, lost the 2018 presidential election. Yameen followed his own predecessor Mohamed Nasheed's forced resignation in a coup led by the police. Nasheed reportedly resigned involuntarily to forestall an escalation of violence, and was placed in jail, before being forced into exile, from which he eventually returned.

The unicameral Majlis of the Maldives is composed of 87 members serving a five-year term. The total number of the members representing each constituency depends on the total population of that constituency. The last parliamentary election was held on 6 April 2019.

The Maldivian legal system is derived mainly from the traditional Islamic law. There is a Supreme Court with 5 judges including the Chief Justice. The Chief Justice is appointed by the President, with the recommendation of the Judicial Service Commission. Parliament is required to approve the appointment before he assumes office. Excluding the Supreme Court, there also exists the High Court (two branches), a Criminal Court, Civil Court, Family Court, Juvenile Court, Drug Court and many Lower Courts in each Atoll/Island. An Attorney General is part of the Cabinet and also needs the approval of Parliament before taking office.

Under the new 2008 constitution, the function of Local Government is devolved to an Atoll Council to administer each atoll and an Island Council to administer each inhabited island. Island councillors are elected by the people of each island, and the Atoll Councillors are in turn elected by the Island Councillors.

The Constitution of the Maldives requires the following for a president: be a Maldivian citizen born to parents who are Maldivian citizens, and who is not also a citizen of a foreign country;be a Muslim and a follower of a Sunni school of Islam;

History

A 1968 referendum approved a constitution making Maldives a republic with executive, legislative, and judicial branches of government. The constitution was amended in 1970, 1972, 1975, and 1997 and again in 2008.

Ibrahim Nasir, Prime Minister under the pre-1968 sultanate, became president and held office from 1968 to 1978. He was succeeded by Maumoon Abdul Gayoom, who was elected president in 1978 and re-elected in 1983, 1988, 1993, 1998, and 2003. At the end of his presidency in 2008, he was the longest serving leader in Asia.

Since 2003, following the death in custody of a prisoner, Naseem, the Maldives experienced several anti-government demonstrations calling for political reforms, more freedoms, and an end to torture and oppression. As a result of these activities, political parties were eventually allowed in June 2005. The main parties registered in Maldives are: the Maldivian Democratic Party (MDP), the Dhivehi Raiyyithunge Party (DRP), the Islamic Democratic Party (IDP) and the Adhaalath Party, also known as the Adhaalath Party. The first party to register was the MDP headed by popular opposition figures such as Mohamed Nasheed (Anni) and Mohamed Latheef (Gogo). The next was the Dhivehi Raiyyithunge Party (DRP) headed by then-President Gayoom.
 
A new Constitution was ratified in August 2008, paving the way for the country's first multi-party presidential election two months later.

The Maldives have scored poorly on some indices of freedom. The "Freedom in the World" index, a measure of political rights and civil liberties published by Freedom House, judged Maldives as "not free" until May 1, 2009, when it was raised to "partly free". The "Worldwide Press Freedom Index", published by Reporters Without Borders, ranks Maldives 98th out of 180 in terms of press freedom as of 2019.

In September 2018, a presidential election was held, during which Ibrahim Mohamed Solih was elected to the post of president, with 58.38% of the public vote. He stood as a member of a joint opposition to Yameen Abdul Gayoom's regime, which had been condemned internationally for shutting down free speech, and violating human rights.

Executive branch

Legislative branch
The Majlis of the Maldives has 87 members elected by the people under first-past-the-post voting.

Political parties and elections
On a national level, Maldives elects a head of state  the president  and a legislature. The president is elected for a five-year term by the people since 2008. Until 2005 (after the election), no legal parties existed. The results of the most recent legislative elections held in 2019 are:

The Maldivian parliament voted unanimously for the creation of a multiparty system on June 2, 2005. Prior to June 2005, the Maldivian political system was based on the election of individuals, rather than the more common system of election according to party platform. In June 2005, as part of an ongoing programme of democratic reform, new regulations were promulgated to formally recognised political parties within the framework of the electoral system.
The Maldivian Democratic Party was already active. New parties created within a few years after this included those such as the Dhivehi Rayyithunge Party, the Jumhooree Party, and the Adhaalath Party.

On October 8, 2008, the country held its first ever multi-party presidential election.

In Maldives 2019 parliamentary election Maldivian Democratic Party (MDP) won 65 seats in the 87 seat parliament. This was the first time a single party was able to get such a high number of seats in the parliament in Maldivian history.

Judicial branch
The legal system is based on Islamic law with admixtures of English common law primarily in commercial matters. Maldives has not accepted compulsory International Court of Justice jurisdiction.

Administrative divisions
20 atolls (atholhu, singular and plural): Alif Alif, Alif Dhaal, Baa, Dhaalu, Faafu, Gaafu Alifu, Gaafu Dhaalu, Gnaviyani, Haa Alifu, Haa Dhaalu, Laamu, Lhaviyani, Kaafu, Meemu, Noonu, Raa, Seenu, Shaviyani, Thaa, Vaavu, and one first-order administrative city (Malé).

International organization participation

The Maldives is a member of many international organisations, some of which include:

The AsDB, Commonwealth of Nations, CP, ESCAP, FAO, G-77, IBRD, ICAO, IDA, IFAD, IFC, International Monetary Fund, IMO, Intelsat (nonsignatory user), Interpol, IOC, IsDB, ITU, NAM, OIC, OPCW, SAARC, UN, UNCTAD, UNESCO, UNIDO, UPU, World Health Organization, WCO, WIPO, WMO, and the WTO.

Governmental agencies
 Ministry of Islamic Affairs

See also

Ilyas Hussain Ibrahim
Abdulla Ubaid
Zahiya Zareer

References

External links
Majlis
Presidency
Amnesty International reports on the Maldives
Freedom of expression in the Maldives - IFEX
Penn Law School Students Help Draft a Criminal Code for the Maldives, from the University of Pennsylvania website
Maldives Holds Cabinet Meeting Underwater to Highlight Danger of Global Warming - video report by Democracy Now!